Aegires evorae is a species of sea slug, a nudibranch, a marine, opisthobranch gastropod mollusc in the family Aegiridae.

The specific name evorae is in honour of Cesária Évora, a Cape Verdean popular singer.

Distribution
This species was described from Calhetinha, in the northeast of the island of Sal, Cape Verde Islands.

Description
Aegires evorae has a cream-white body with a patchy brown overlay which is broken by regularly spaced, circular patches of darker brown dots. The rhinophores have a distinctive narrow band of brown below the tip.

Ecology
This nudibranch probably feeds on the calcareous sponge, Clathrina coriacea.

References

Aegiridae
Gastropods described in 2015
Fauna of Sal, Cape Verde